Aluniș is a commune in Cluj County, Transylvania, Romania. It is composed of five villages: Aluniș, Corneni (Szilkerék), Ghirolt (Girolt), Pruneni (Kecsedszilvás) and Vale (Bánffytótfalu).

Demographics
According to the census from 2002 there was a total population of 1,403 people living in this commune. Of this population, 99% are ethnic Romanians, 0.92% are ethnic Hungarians and 0.07% ethnic Romani.

References 

Atlasul localităţilor judeţului Cluj (Cluj County Localities Atlas), Suncart Publishing House, Cluj-Napoca, 

Communes in Cluj County
Localities in Transylvania